Khayelihle Kenneth Mthiyane SC (13 September 1944 – 28 January 2021) was a South African jurist, judge and deputy President of the Supreme Court of Appeal of South Africa.

Early life and education
Mthiyane was born in Ndwedwe, in Kwazulu-Natal and received his education at Loram Secondary school, where he matriculated in 1967. He then enrolled at the University of South Africa and obtained his BIuris degree in 1972 after which he furthered his studies at the University of Natal obtaining an LL.B. in 1984 and an LL.M. in 1994.

Career
Mthiyane was admitted as an attorney in 1975 and nine years later was admitted as an advocate, joining the Durban Bar in 1984. He was granted senior counsel status in 1995 and was given his first acting judge appointment shortly thereafter. Mthiyane was appointed judge to the KwaZulu-Natal Division of the High Court. In 2001, he was appointed a Judge of the Supreme Court of Appeal and, after serving for eleven years in that court, was appointed its Deputy President of the court in 2012, which post he held until he retired in 2014. He then served as a Chairperson of the Electoral Court of South Africa.

Death
Mthiyane died on 28 January 2021 after a short illness due to COVID-19 complications during the COVID-19 pandemic in South Africa and within a week after the funeral of his wife, Mrs S'thandiwe Mthiyane.

References

1944 births
2021 deaths
South African judges
Deaths from the COVID-19 pandemic in South Africa
People from Ndwedwe Local Municipality
University of South Africa alumni
University of Natal alumni